The Palmetto Subdivision is a CSX Transportation rail line in the Tampa Bay region of Florida.  It runs from East Tampa and roughly parallels U.S. Route 41 south through Ruskin to Palmetto and Bradenton.  The Palmetto Subdivision ends just south of Tropicana Yard in Oneco, where it connects with the Seminole Gulf Railway, a shortline that continues south into Sarasota.

The line notably serves The Mosaic Company's Riverview phosphate plant near the Alafia River, TECO Energy's Big Bend Power Station in southern Hillsoborough County, and Port Manatee in northern Manatee County.  It also serves the Tropicana Juice Plant in Bradenton, with Tropicana's Juice Train continuing to be the most consistent service on the line today.

Parrish Spur
The Parrish Spur branches off the line in Palmetto and runs northeast to Ellenton, Parrish, and Willow.  The line notably serves a Conrad Yelvington Distribution facility in Palmetto.  Florida Power and Light owns the right-of-way east of Palmetto with the Florida Railroad Museum operating excursion trains on the line from its base in Parrish to Willow.  CSX occasionally operates over the line to Willow to serve FPL's power plant there.

History

The line from East Tampa to Bradenton was built by the Tampa Southern Railroad, which was first incorporated in 1917 as a subsidiary of the Atlantic Coast Line Railroad.  The Tampa Southern's tracks were completed to Bradenton by May 1924.  

The Parrish Spur and the track south of Tropicana Yard to Oneco was built earlier in 1903 by the Florida West Shore Railway, a subsidiary of the Seaboard Air Line Railroad.  This line originally had its own swing bridge over the Manatee River about a half mile east of the current bascule bridge (the Tampa Southern's original bridge).

In 1967, the Seaboard Air Line and the Atlantic Coast Line merged to form the Seaboard Coast Line Railroad.  The merger brought the all of the track under a single owner and led to consolidation of the Manatee River crossing to a single bridge, creating the track structure that is in place today.  The Seaboard's swing bridge was subsequently demolished. 

In 1980, the Seaboard Coast Line's parent company merged with the Chessie System, creating the CSX Corporation.  The CSX Corporation initially operated the Chessie and Seaboard Systems separately until 1986, when they were merged into CSX Transportation.  The same year, the Parrish Spur (which operated as the Parrish Subdivision under SCL) was abandoned north of Willow to Durant.  The Palmetto Subdivision also continued south of Oneco to Sarasota and Venice in the SCL era before that segment was taken over by Fort Myers-based Seminole Gulf Railway in 1987.

Today, the mileposts on the former Atlantic Coast Line segments have an AZA prefix, and the Seaboard Air Line segments have an SW prefix.

See also
 List of CSX Transportation lines

References

CSX Transportation lines
Florida railroads